Maguey worms, are one of two species of edible caterpillars that infest maguey (Agave americana) and Agave tequilana plants.

White maguey worm
The white maguey worms, known as meocuiles, are caterpillars of a butterfly commonly named "tequila giant skipper," Aegiale hesperiaris.

Aegiale hesperiaris is found usually in regions of Central Mexico, on the leaves of Family Agavaceae plants, such as: Agave tequilana and Agave americana (maguey). They are not found on cacti, as is often erroneously reported. Aegiale hesperiaris butterflies deposit their eggs at the heart of the leaves of agaves. The larvae then eat the flesh of the agave stems and roots, sometimes boring out the agave completely.

Red maguey worm
The red maguey worms are known as chilocuiles, chinicuiles or tecoles, and are the larvae of the moth Comadia redtenbacheri. These infest the core and roots of the maguey plant, often in a collective mass. Along with agave snout weevil larvae (mezcal worm), red maguey worms are one of the types of gusanos found in bottles of mezcal liquor from the Mexican state of Oaxaca.

In Mexican cuisine

They are considered a highly nutritious delicacy in Mexican cuisine. One 100-gram serving contains over 650 calories, or the equivalent of two plates of rice. While they are sometimes eaten alive and raw, they are also considered delicious deep-fried or braised, seasoned with salt, lime, and a spicy sauce, and served in a tortilla.

References

Maguey worms: a mexican tasty snack

Edible insects
Mexican cuisine
Insect common names
Agave